The 1961 Society of Film and Television Arts Television Awards, the United Kingdom's premier television awards ceremony. The awards later became known as the British Academy Television Awards, under which name they are still given.

Winners
Actor
Lee Montague
Actress
Billie Whitelaw
Current Events
Sportsview unit (BBC)
Designer
Fred Pusey
Desmond Davis Award for Services to Television
Richard Dimbleby
Drama Production
Peter Dews
Factual
Michael Redington
Light Entertainment
James Gilbert
Light Entertainment (Artist)
Stanley Baxter
Personality
Eamonn Andrews
Scriptwriter
Alun Owen
Writers Award
Alun Owen

References

External links
http://awards.bafta.org/1961.

British Academy Film Awards
1961 in the United Kingdom
1961 television awards
1961 in British television